Petre Ivănescu (15 April 1936 – 1 April 2022) was a Romanian handball player and coach who played for Dinamo București and for the Romania national team.

Coach

Team
VfL Gummersbach
Bundesliga:  1982, 1983
DHB-Pokal: 1982, 1983
EHF Champions League: 1983
EHF Cup: 1982
EHF Supercup: 1979, 1983

TUSEM Essen
Bundesliga: 1986
DHB-Pokal: 1991, 1992

Individual
Handball Manager of the Year: 1987, 1988

References

External links 
 Personal website

1936 births
2022 deaths
Romanian handball coaches
Sportspeople from Bucharest
Romanian male handball players
CS Dinamo București (men's handball) players
Romanian expatriate sportspeople in Germany